Dick Ballantine is a fictional character played by actor and comic Richard Belzer on segments of The National Lampoon Radio Hour, aired on some 600 U.S. radio stations between 1973 and 1975. The character is an ersatz radio call-in host. 

His callers, played by other Radio Hour regulars including Bill Murray, were subject to Ballantine's tart-tongued responses to their predictably obtuse opinions, typically capped by his addressing them sarcastically as "Babe". In one exchange, Murray's call-in character expresses irritation that inmates of a New York State maximum security hotel, recently the scene of the Attica Prison riots, are being given connubial visiting privileges which he disagrees with.  Belzer's character inquires if the caller knows what the phrase "boned up the ass" means.  When Murray admits that he does not, Belzer pithily suggests that he has no idea what he is complaining about.  

In another exchange, Christopher Guest, playing a man with a clipped British RP accent, tells Ballantine that he has wrongfully accused a hired servant of stealing some personal property and asks if there some way he can contact him to apologize.  The caller describes the wronged individual as "a colored man" to which Ballantine pointedly asks "What color is he?"  

Several of these radio bits were released on National Lampoon records in the mid and late 1970s, including That's Not Funny, That's Sick and The White Album.

Male characters in radio
Fictional radio personalities
Comedy radio characters
National Lampoon (franchise)
Radio characters introduced in 1973